The Minister of State for Crime, Policing and Fire is a ministerial position held at the Home Office in the Government of the United Kingdom. Holders of this office have previously held additional responsibilities such as for security, counter-terrorism and the fire service. The post had responsibility for the fire service from January 2016 to July 2019 and again from August 2019 to February 2020.

This role was created by the splitting of the now-defunct office of the Minister for Security, Counter-Terrorism, Crime and Policing into two new ministerial posts: Security & Counter-Terrorism and Crime & Policing.

The previous minister was Jeremy Quin, who served from 7 September 2022 to 25 October 2022 in the Truss Ministry. After Liz Truss resigned and Rishi Sunak became Prime Minister, Quin was appointed as Paymaster General and Minister for the Cabinet Office. He was replaced by Chris Philp.

Ministers

References

Police
1993 establishments in the United Kingdom